Tajpura is a village in Mohali district in the state of Punjab, India.

Villages in Rupnagar district